Croatia is set to participate in the Eurovision Song Contest 2023 in Liverpool, United Kingdom, with "" performed by Let 3. The Croatian broadcaster Croatian Radiotelevision (HRT) organised the national final  2023 to select the Croatian entry for the 2023 contest.

Background 

In , Croatia failed to qualify to the final with Mia Dimšić and the song "Guilty Pleasure".

The Croatian national broadcaster, Croatian Radiotelevision (HRT), broadcasts the event within Croatia and organises the selection process for the nation's entry. HRT confirmed Croatia's participation in the 2023 Eurovision Song Contest on 20 September 2022. Between 1993 and 2011, HRT organised the national final  in order to select the Croatian entry for the Eurovision Song Contest. In 2012 and 2013, the broadcaster opted to internally select the entry. After missing the contest in 2014 and 2015, the Croatian broadcaster continued the internal selection procedure between 2016 and 2018. Since 2019, HRT has used  to select Croatia's entry, a method that was continued for their 2023 participation.

Before Eurovision

Dora 2023 
 2023 was the twenty-fourth edition of the Croatian national selection  which selects Croatia's entry for the Eurovision Song Contest 2023. The competition consisted of eighteen entries competing in one final on 11 February 2023 at the Marino Cvetković Sports Hall in Opatija, hosted by Mirko Fodor, Mario Lipovšek Battifiaca and Marko Tolja. The show was broadcast on HRT 1 as well as online via the streaming service HRTi. The national final was watched by over 900,000 viewers in Croatia with a market share of 42%.

Competing entries 
On 20 September 2022, HRT opened a submission period where artists and composers were able to submit their entries to the broadcaster with the deadline on 20 November 2022. 196 entries were received by the broadcaster during the submission period. A nine-member expert committee consisting of Željko Mesar, Zlatko Turkalj, Robert Urlić, Ema Gross, Igor Geržina, Željen Klašterka, Ivan Horvat, Tomislav Krizmanić and Dražen Miočić reviewed the received submissions and selected eighteen artists and songs for the competition. HRT announced the competing entries on 9 December 2022 and among the competing artists was Damir Kedžo, who was set to represent Croatia in the Eurovision Song Contest 2020 before its cancellation.

Final 
The final took place on 11 February 2023. The winner, "" performed by Let 3, was determined by a 50/50 combination of votes from ten regional juries and a public televote. The viewers and the juries each had a total of 580 points to award. Each jury group distributed their points as follows: 1-8, 10 and 12 points. The viewer vote was based on the percentage of votes each song achieved through telephone and SMS voting. For example, if a song gained 10% of the viewer vote, then that entry would be awarded 10% of 580 points rounded to the nearest integer: 58 points. Ties were decided in favour of the entry ranked higher by the public televote. In addition to the performances of the competing entries, the show was opened by 2022 Croatian Eurovision entrant Mia Dimšić, while 1994 Croatian Eurovision entrant Tony Cetinski performed as the interval act.

At Eurovision 
According to Eurovision rules, all nations with the exceptions of the host country and the "Big Five" (France, Germany, Italy, Spain and the United Kingdom) are required to qualify from one of two semi-finals in order to compete for the final; the top ten countries from each semi-final progress to the final. The European Broadcasting Union (EBU) split up the competing countries into six different pots based on voting patterns from previous contests, with countries with favourable voting histories put into the same pot. On 31 January 2023, an allocation draw was held, which placed each country into one of the two semi-finals, and determined which half of the show they would perform in. Croatia has been placed into the first semi-final, to be held on 9 May 2023, and has been scheduled to perform in the first half of the show.

References

External links 

 

2023
Countries in the Eurovision Song Contest 2023
Eurovision